"Daphne Laureola" is a 1965 Australian television play based on Daphne Laureola by James Bridie. It screened as part of Wednesday Theatre.

Australian TV drama was relatively rare at the time.

It was dedicated to Dame Edith Evans, who had played the part on stage.

Plot
A young Pole, Ernest, falls  in love with the older, alcoholic Lady Pitts, when they meet in a London restaurant.

Cast
Raymond Westwell as Sir Joseph Pitts
Terry Aldred as Lady Pitts
Edward Howell
Mark Albiston as Ernest
Simon Chilvers
Sydney Conabere
William King
Elspeth Ballantyne
Jeffrey Hodgson
Georgie Alcock
Wayne Maddern

Reception
The TV critic for the Sydney Morning Herald thought it was "the kind of play which, if anyone cares then, will be a period piece in 30 years' time... It is not a particularly good or compelling play and while it was given an excellent performance from the A.B.C. Melbourne studios... it emerged as pretty dated... [even though it was made] rather unconvincingly contemporary."

The play itself was described by critic Alan Riach as having 'Egalitarianism.. at the heart of this vision, but idealism may be just a liability.'

References

External links
 Daphne Laureola 1965 television play at Austlit

1965 television plays
1965 Australian television episodes
1960s Australian television plays
Wednesday Theatre (season 1) episodes